Lythraria is a genus of flea beetles in the family Chrysomelidae, containing a single described species, Lythraria salicariae, from the Palaearctic.

References

Alticini
Monotypic Chrysomelidae genera